Jesús Rosas Marcano (5 January 1930 - 7 May 2001), was a Venezuelan educator, journalist, poet and composer of folk songs popularized by the group Un Solo Pueblo, such as "Botaste la bola" and "Negro como yo".

Marcano was born in La Asunción. In 1945, he graduated as school teacher at the Miguel Antonio Caro Institute. Began his career at the Rural School Caurimare in east Caracas. Later, studied journalism in the Central University of Venezuela (UCV), receiving postgraduate education at the Sorbonne University of Paris. From his return in the late 1950s, starts working as teacher and researcher in his alma mater. Worked as reporter for the newspaper Últimas Noticias, directed by Oscar Yánes, starting to write humorous verses under the pseudonym of Ross Mar. For twenty years, Rosas had the columns Capilla Ardiente and Espuma de los Días, both in daily El Nacional.

In the 1980s, begins with the column Veinte Líneas in "El Diario de Caracas". Also, was columnist of weekly "Quinto Día" from 1998. 
In 1999, was invited to collaborate in "Así es la Noticia", where returned with Capilla Ardiente. In the newspaper "Sol de Margarita", wrote a weekly humor page under the name of Pata e 'cabra, which allowed him to be contributor of the humoristic newspaper Camaleón. Between his career as poet, can be mentioned the works "Proclama de la espiga" (1958), "Cotiledón, Cotiledón, la vida" (1965), "Manso vidrio del aire" (1968), "Así en la tierra como en el cielo" (1976), among others. In his labor as school teacher, worked in publications for children like: "Tricolor", "La ventana mágica" and "Onza, tigre y león".

He died in Caracas, aged 71.

See also 
Francisco Pacheco
Literature of Venezuela
List of Venezuelan writers

References
  Jesús Rosas Marcano - Guaiqueri.net
  ¿Quién fue Jesús Rosas Marcano? - Correo del Caroní

1930 births
2001 deaths
People from Nueva Esparta
Venezuelan male composers
Venezuelan male poets
Venezuelan schoolteachers
Central University of Venezuela alumni
Academic staff of the Central University of Venezuela
University of Paris alumni
20th-century Venezuelan poets
20th-century male writers
20th-century male musicians